Pueraria is a genus of 15–20 species of legumes native to Asia. The best known member is kudzu, also called Japanese arrowroot. The genus is named after 19th century Swiss botanist Marc Nicolas Puerari.

The genus, as traditionally circumscribed, is polyphyletic, with different species being more related to other species in the tribe Phaseoleae. Current research, reproduced below, splits the genus into five clades, one of which defines the current monophyletic genus.

Species 
The genus Pueraria is highly polyphyletic; the below list is divided by clade following the result of A.N.Egan & B.Pan (2016). In 2015, the authors validly published their proposal in Phytotaxa. , Kew Plants of the World Online database accepts these names.

Pueraria sensu stricto 
Pueraria sensu stricto includes the vast majority of species in the genus. They fall into a single clade sister to or containing Nogra.

 P. alopecuroides Craib
 P. calycina Franch.
 P. candollei  Benth.
 P. edulis Pamp.
 P. imbricata Maesen
 P. lacei Craib
 P. mirifica Airy Shaw & Suvat. (= P. candollei var. mirifica in Egan)
 P. montana (Lour.) Merr. – US invasive population comes from a hybrid of more than one of the subspecies.
Pueraria montana var. chinensis (Ohwi) Sanjappa & Pradeep (= P. chinensis, although ILDS and the plant list instead consider P. thomsonii the synonym)
Pueraria montana var. lobata (Willd.) Sanjappa & Pradeep (= P. lobata)
Pueraria montana var. thomsonii (Benth.) Wiersema ex D.B. Ward (= P. thomsonii, missing in ILDS)
 P. pulcherrima (Koord.) Koord.-Schum.
 P. sikkimensis Prain
 P. tuberosa (Roxb.ex Willd.) DC. – type species

Provisionally retained 
The following are not included in the 2016 study due to insufficient material for sequencing. They are accepted by POWO.
P. bella Prain: conflicting proposals assigning either to the main clade or to Neonotonia (morphology).
 P. bouffordii H. Ohashi: presumably in the main clade (morphology).
 P. grandiflora Bo Pan & Bing Liu: presumably in the main clade (morphology).
 P. xyzhuii H. Ohashi & Iokawa: presumably in the main clade (morphology).

The following are not included in Egan et al. 2016 for other reasons, but are accepted by Kew POWO:
 P. garhwalensis L.R.Dangwal & D.S.Rawat: excluded per van der Maesen (2002)
 P. neocaledonica Harms: not mentioned
 P. maesenii Niyomdham: not mentioned

Former members 
The rest of the genus fall into four clades, sorted by distance from the main clade:

 Neustanthus Benth. – sister to Sinodolichos
 P. phaseoloides (Roxb.) Benth. → N. phaseoloides (Roxb.) Benth.P. edulis, P. montana, and N. phaseoloides make up what is known as kudzu. The morphological differences between these species are subtle.
 N. phaseoloides var. javanicus (= P. javanica (Benth.) Benth.)
 N. phaseoloides var. phaseoloides
 N. phaseoloides var. subspicatus
 Teyleria
 P. stricta Kurz → T. stricta
 Toxicopueraria A.N.Egan & B.Pan – sister to Cologania
 P. peduncularis Grah. → T. peduncularis
 P. yunnanensis Franchet.→ T. yunnanensis
 Haymondia A.N.Egan & B.Pan – notably lies out of Glycininae near Kennediinae; known for a long time to be misplaced
 P. wallichii DC. → H. wallichii

The following names are not accepted even before Egan 2016 but have seen valid publication:
 P. omeiensis Wang et Tang – P. montana: unaccepted name after Mount Omei.
 P. stracheyi Baker → Apios carnea (Wall.) Benth. ex Baker.
 P. maclurei (F. P. Metcalf) F. J. Herm. → Sinodolichos lagopus – still accepted by WFO

References 

 
Fabaceae genera
Taxa named by Augustin Pyramus de Candolle